Glinishche is a rural locality (a khutor) in Mikhaylovka Urban Okrug, Volgograd Oblast, Russia. The population was 55 as of 2010. There are 5 streets.

Geography 
Glinishche is located 48 km east of Mikhaylovka. 2-y Sukhov is the nearest rural locality.

References 

Rural localities in Mikhaylovka urban okrug